Felix Clewett (10 March 1836 – 13 February 1913) was a member of  the Queensland Legislative Council.

Early life 
Clewett was born in Sydney, New South Wales to George Clewett and his wife Ann (née Curtis) and educated at St. James's Grammar School, Sydney. In 1867, Clewett had married Isabella Jane Cox and together they had five children.

Politics 
Clewett was appointed to the Queensland Legislative Council in July 1890 and served for over twenty-two years till his death in February, 1913.

Later life 
He died in 1913, and was buried in Toowong Cemetery.

References

External links

 Photo of the late Hon. F. Clewett M.L.C.
  — biography in the Rockhampton Morning Bulletin

Members of the Queensland Legislative Council
1836 births
1913 deaths
Burials at Toowong Cemetery